Val-des-Prés is a commune in the Hautes-Alpes department in southeastern France.

It is situated in the Clarée Valley.

Population

Personalities
The village was the home of Émilie Carles who wrote her memoir A Wild Herb Soup (or A Life of her Own, original French: Une Soupe aux herbes sauvages) (1977) describing life in the village in the early and mid 20th century.

See also
Communes of the Hautes-Alpes department

References

Communes of Hautes-Alpes